Spencer "Spenny" Douglas David Compton, 7th Marquess of Northampton (born 2 April 1946) is a British peer.

Family
Compton is the son of the Most Hon. William Compton, 6th Marquess of Northampton and Virginia Lucie Compton, née Heaton. The family seats are Castle Ashby House and Compton Wynyates.

The heir apparent to the marquessate and its subsidiary titles is Northampton's only son Daniel, Earl Compton (b. 1973). Since he has, so far, fathered no sons of his own, the heir apparent's heir presumptive is his first cousin James William Compton (b. 1974), son of the late Lord William James Bingham Compton (1947–2007), who has three daughters (Abigail 2002, Geneveve 2004, Elenor 2006) and one son (William Edward Richard Compton, b. 2010) by his wife Natasha Somers (married 2000). The next heir is Alwyne Compton (b. 1919), the most senior grandson of Lord Alwyne Frederick Compton (1855–1911), the third son of the 4th Marquess; he is childless.  His brother the late Robert "Robin" Compton (1922–2009) left two sons, both of whom have two sons of their own.

Personal life
He was listed as having properties worth £120 million in the 2011 Estates Gazette Rich List. In the Sunday Times Rich List 2017, ranking the wealthiest people in the UK, he was listed with an estimated fortune of £110million. In 1985 he sold Adoration of the Magi by Andrea Mantegna at Christie's in London to the Getty Museum for a then-world record auction price of $10.5 million (£8.1m). In November 1993, the Appellate Division of the New York State Supreme Court confirmed his claim to the ownership of the Sevso Treasure, a hoard of late Roman Empire silver.

He is a Freemason, and served as the Pro Grand Master of the United Grand Lodge of England from 2001 until March 2009.

He has been married six times. On 13 June 1967, Compton married Henriette Luisa Maria Bentinck, daughter of Adolph Willem Carel Baron Bentinck and Gabrielle Baronin Thyssen-Bornemisza de Kaszon. The couple had two children and divorced in 1973.
 Lady Lara Katrina Compton (b. 26 April 1968)
 Daniel Bingham Compton, Earl Compton (b. 16 January 1973)

The next year, in 1974, Compton married Annette Marie Smallwood; they divorced in 1977. Later that year, he married Rosemary Ashley Morrit Hancock, who had previously been married to Hon. Lionel Dawson-Damer. They had one child before divorcing in 1983.
 Lady Emily Rose Compton (b. 1980)

On 12 January 1985, he married Hannelore Ellen (née Erhardt), who had previously been married to Michael Pearson, 4th Viscount Cowdray. Compton and Erhardt had one child and divorced in 1988.
 Lady Louisa Cecilia Compton (b. 1985)

In 10 December 1990, he married Pamela Martina Raphaela (née Haworth), who had previously been married to Emanuel Kyprios. They divorced in January 2013. Later that same year, on 4 September 2013 in London, he married Tracy Goodman, to whom he has remained married.

Arms

See also
Sevso Treasure
Northampton Sekhemka statue

References

1946 births
Living people
Spencer
Marquesses of Northampton (1812 creation)
People educated at Eton College
Northampton